Aurelio Iragorri Hormaza (28 April 1937 – 7 September 2020) was a Colombian politician who served as the President of the Chamber of Representatives and a Senator.

Iragorri died from complications of COVID-19 on 7 September 2020, at the age of 83 during the COVID-19 pandemic in Colombia.

References

1937 births
2020 deaths
Presidents of the Chamber of Representatives of Colombia
Members of the Chamber of Representatives of Colombia
Governors of Cauca Department
Deaths from the COVID-19 pandemic in Colombia